Armenia allows citizens of specific countries and territories to visit Armenia for tourism or business purposes without having to obtain a visa or allows them to obtain a visa on arrival or online. For some countries the visa requirement waiver is practiced on ad hoc basis and is not formalized by a bilateral agreement. Citizens of the Commonwealth of Independent States and citizens of all Eurasian Economic Union and European Union member states may enter Armenia without a visa.

Visa policy map

Visa-free countries
Holders of all types of passports from the following countries are not required to obtain a visa for entry to Armenia for a 180-day period within any year period (unless otherwise noted):

Citizens of Russia and Georgia may enter without a passport, a national identification card will suffice.

1 – Up to 90 days.
2 – May use internal passport for stays of up to 180 days per year.
3 – Citizens of Azerbaijan must have a special entry permit.
 Holders of diplomatic or official/service passports of Chile, Egypt, Indonesia, Kuwait, Lebanon, Mexico, Mongolia, Philippines, Syria, Turkmenistan, Vietnam and holders of diplomatic passports of Bosnia and Herzegovina, India, Jordan do not require a visa to visit Armenia.

Visa on arrival
Visitors traveling as tourists from the following countries can obtain a visa on arrival for a maximum stay of 120 days at a cost of AMD 15,000. They may also apply for an e-visa in advance.

Conditional visa on arrival
Citizens of these countries and territories can apply for a visa on arrival only if they hold a valid sticker visa or resident card issued by Australia, Canada, GCC countries, Japan, New Zealand, Russia, South Korea, EU or Schengen Area member states, United Kingdom or United States. They may also apply for an e-visa in advance.

E-visa
All foreign visitors (except those from the countries below) are also eligible to apply for an e-visa. E-visa allows applicants to stay up to 120 days or 21 days with a US$31 or US$6 fee. Application should be submitted at least 3 business days before the trip.

Visa required in advance
Nationals of the following countries can only apply for a visa at Armenian diplomatic or consular posts, and only with an invitation:

Admission refused
Armenia also does not recognize the passports of Abkhazia, South Ossetia, Transnistria, Somaliland and Sahrawi.

Statistics

See also

Armenian passport
Foreign relations of Armenia
Visa policy of Artsakh
Visa requirements for Armenian citizens

References

External links
 Schematic instructions for the process of obtaining Armenian visa 
 Armenia E-visa Application

Armenia
Foreign relations of Armenia